Soeiro Raimundes de Riba de Vizela (mid-12th century - 1220) was a Portuguese nobleman, who served as alferes-mor of Afonso II of Portugal.

He was born in Portugal, the son of Raimundo Pais de Riba de Vizela and Dordia Afonso de Riba Douro, granddaughter of Egas Moniz, o Aio. 
   
Soeiro Raimundez of Riba de Vizela was the husband of Urraca Viegas Barroso, daughter Egas Gomes Barroso and Urraca Vasques de Ambia.

References

External links 
familiamelobanha.no.sapo.pt

12th-century births
1220 deaths
12th-century Portuguese people
13th-century Portuguese people
Portuguese nobility
Portuguese Roman Catholics